During the 2001–02 English football season, Derby County competed in the FA Premier League (known as the FA Barclaycard Premiership for sponsorship reasons).

Season summary
Derby started their new season quite well with a 2–1 win over newly-promoted Blackburn Rovers. Manager Jim Smith rejected the offer to become Director of Football and resigned on 7 October after more than six years at the helm. His assistant Colin Todd, who won two league titles with the club in the 1970s, was promoted to the manager's seat, but by this stage the Rams were deep in relegation trouble. A shock 3–1 home defeat against Division Three strugglers Bristol Rovers in the FA Cup proved the final straw for the directors and Todd was sacked days later, after a mere three months in charge. By the end of the month, John Gregory had taken over at Pride Park just six days after quitting Aston Villa. Two quick wins and a draw against Manchester United suggested that Gregory might be Derby's saviour, but seven defeats from their final eight games condemned Derby to relegation.

Final league table

Results summary

Results by round

Results
Derby County's score comes first

Legend

FA Premier League

FA Cup

League Cup

Players

First-team squad
Squad at end of season

Left club during season

Reserve squad
The following players did not appear for the first team this season.

Transfers

In

Out

Transfers in:  £3,450,000
Transfers out:  £11,000,000
Total spending:  £7,550,000

Loan in

Loan out

Statistics

Appearances and goals

|-
! colspan=14 style=background:#dcdcdc; text-align:center| Goalkeepers

|-
! colspan=14 style=background:#dcdcdc; text-align:center| Defenders and wing-backs

|-
! colspan=14 style=background:#dcdcdc; text-align:center| Midfielders

|-
! colspan=14 style=background:#dcdcdc; text-align:center| Forwards

|-
! colspan=14 style=background:#dcdcdc; text-align:center| Players transferred out during the season

|}

Notes

References

Derby County F.C. seasons
Derby County